With Passion was an American heavy metal band from Sacramento, California. They were formed in 2002 and broke up in 2007.

Biography 
The band hails from Sacramento and was formed by Samuel Mcleod, Shaun Gier, Jeff Morgan, and Jacob Peete, but did not acquire a permanent bassist until 2003 with Michael Nordeen. Jeff Morgan later left the band and was replaced by Andrew Burt. Keyboardist Brandon Guadagnolo joined the band later on, and with this line-up the band released an EP, In the Midst of Bloodied Soil.

Jacob Pete, Andy Burt, Sam Mcleod and Brandon Guadagnolo left the band in the summer of 2005, and drummer Greg Donnelly and guitarist John Abernathy, both from Conducting from the Grave, joined in 2006. At this moment, the line-up consisted of no fewer than four former Conducting from the Grave members, the only exception being bassist Michael Nordeen. Later that year, vocalist Shaun Gier left the band and was replaced by Fidel Campos, just in time for the recording of their debut album.

The band released their debut album, In the Midst of Bloodied Soil, in 2005, with the same title as their EP, through Earache Records—the songs are the same as on the EP, with two additional tracks.

The band's second album, What We See When We Shut Our Eyes, was released in early 2007 on Earache, but the band broke up soon thereafter. Since then, Conducting from the Grave has reformed.

Members

Final line-up 
 Fidel Campos – vocals 
 John Abernathy – guitar 
 Jeff Morgan – guitar 
 Steven Lovas – bass 
 Greg Donnelly – drums

Former members 
 Shaun Gier – guitar , vocals 
 Jacob Peete – drums 
 Brandon Guadagnolo – keyboards 
 Sam Mcleod – vocals 
 Andy Burt – guitar 
 Justin Tvetan – drums 
 Michael Nordeen – bass 
 Joey Ellis – bass 

Timeline

Discography 
 In the Midst of Bloodied Soil (CD, Earache, 2005)
 What We See When We Shut Our Eyes (CD, Earache, 2007)

References 

Death metal musical groups from California
Metalcore musical groups from California
Black metal musical groups from California
Musical groups established in 2002
Musical groups disestablished in 2007
Earache Records artists
Musical quintets
Musical groups from Sacramento, California
2002 establishments in California